The gray-headed elaenia  or Atlantic gray elaenia (Myiopagis caniceps) is a species of bird in the family Tyrannidae.  It is found from southeast Brazil to Bolivia, Paraguay, and northern Argentina.  Its natural habitat is subtropical or tropical moist lowland forest.

References

Myiopagis
Birds described in 1835
Taxonomy articles created by Polbot